The Portland Music and Art Fair was a rock festival held in Portland, Oregon, in 1970.

References

1970 festivals
1970 in music
1970 in Oregon
Festivals in Portland, Oregon
Rock festivals in the United States